New Mole Battery was an artillery battery in the British Overseas Territory of Gibraltar.

Description
The New Mole Battery is used by the Gibraltar Fire Brigade for practise. which has not assisted its condition. The nearby Alexandra Battery is said to be in good condition.

References

Batteries in Gibraltar